Brotherhood is a 2002 modern television serial jointly produced by Singapore's MediaCorp and China's Beijing YaHuan Media Co. (北京亚环影音), in conjunction with Beijing Broadcasting Institute. Starring Hong Kong actor Jordan Chan, Singaporean-based celebrity couple Fann Wong and Christopher Lee as well as mainland Chinese actresses Huang Yi and Hao Lei, the serial is set in modern-day Shanghai and Singapore, telling of the inter-generational feud between two twin brothers. It stars Jordan Chan, Huang Yi, Christopher Lee, Fann Wong, and Hao Lei.

Cast 
 Jordan Chan – He Fan
 Christopher Lee – He Ping
 Fann Wong – Li Ting
 Huang Yi – Zhou Ying
 Hao Lei – Zhou Qian

Broadcast 
Brotherhood premiered on Mediacorp's Channel 8 on 5 May 2002 with a 2 hour special.

Accolades

References

External links 

Singapore Chinese dramas